Moralzarzal is a town in Spain. It is located in the Sierra de Guadarrama, in the Community of Madrid. It had a population of 11,318 in  2008.

Public Transport 
Moralzarzal has a big bus network. The bus lines going through Moralzarzal are the following:

 670: Collado Villalba (Hospital)

 671: Madrid (Moncloa)

 672: Madrid (Moncloa) - Cerceda (by Mataelpino)

 672A: Madrid (Moncloa) - Cerceda

 720: Colmenar Viejo - Collado Villalba

 876: Collado Villalba - Cerceda - Madrid (Plaza de Castilla)

 Night bus line 603: Moralzarzal - Villalba - Madrid (Moncloa)

References

External links
 The official site of the city 

Municipalities in the Community of Madrid